Tony Au Ting-Ping (born 1954) is a Hong Kong film director and artist.

Biography
He was born in Guangdong. After graduating from high school in 1972, he engaged in fashion design. Afterwards, he studied filming at the London Film Academy. He entered the Hong Kong film industry in 1979.

He is married to the actress Teresa Mo (毛舜筠) and has two daughters, Au Yik-san (區亦山) and Au Ling-san (區令山).

Career
His work as art director includes: Tsui Hark's Dangerous Encounters: 1st Kind (1980), Ann Hui's The Story of Woo Viet (1981), Boat People (1982), Ronny Yu's The Postman Strikes Back (1982), Clifford Choi's Lemon Coke (1982), Shu Kei's Soul (1986).

Filmography
Filmography as director, art director and other positions:
 Men Suddenly In Black 2 (2006), Art director
 Chinese Odyssey 2002 (2002), Production Designer
 Troublesome Night 3 (1998), Actor 	
 The Christ Of Nanjing (1995), Director 	
 A Touch Of Evil (1995), Director, Writer 	
 Crime Story (1993), Art director 	
 Flying Dagger (1993), Art director 	
 A Roof With A View (1993), Director 	
 King of Beggars (1992), Costume Designer 	
 Au Revoir Mon Amour (1991), Director 	
 Finale In Blood (1991), Producer 	
 Blonde Fury (1989), Art director 	
 I'm Sorry (1988), Director 	
 Profiles Of Pleasure (1988), Director, Art director 	
 Sworn Brothers (1987), Art director, Actor 	
 Dream Lovers (1986), Director 	
 Legacy of Rage (1986), Art director 	
 The Millionaire's Express (1986), Costume Designer, Art director 	
 Rosa (1986), Art director 	
 Where's Officer Tuba? (1986), Art director 	
 Women (1985), Art director 	
 Love in a Fallen City (1984), Art director 	
 The Last Affair (1983), Director 	
 Boat People (1982), Art director 	
 Teenage Dreamers (1982), Art director 	
 RTHK television drama 浮雲 (1981), Actor 	
 The Story of Woo Viet (1981), Art director 	
 The Beasts (1980), Art director 	
 Dangerous Encounters of the First Kind (1980), Art director 	
 See Bar (1980), Art director

Awards
In 1983, he won Best Art Direction award with Boat People at the second Hong Kong Film Awards. In the same year, he directed Last Affair, which won the Best New Performer and the Best Cinematography awards at the third Hong Kong Film Awards. In 1986, he directed Dream Lovers, which won the Best Original Film Score award at the sixth Hong Kong Film Awards. In 1995, he directed Hong Kong-Japan film The Christ of Nanjing, which won the Best Artistic Contribution Award at the eighth Tokyo International Film Festival.

References

External links
 

Hong Kong film directors
Living people
Film directors from Guangdong
1954 births